SS La Provence was an ocean liner and auxiliary cruiser torpedoed and sunk in the Mediterranean Sea on 26 February 1916. She belonged to the French Compagnie Générale Transatlantique.

When launched on 21 March 1905 in a ceremony attended by the Ministers of Public Works and Commerce along with the First Secretary of Marine, La Provence was the largest ship in the French merchant marine and the largest built in France.

La Provence
A proposal to power the ship with turbines was rejected and two conventional triple expansion steam engines chosen instead driving two screws with 30,000 IHP for an expected speed of 23 knots. Four steam driven dynamos supplied electric power. The ship was designed with accommodation for 397 first class, 205 second class and 900 third class passengers served by 435 crew members for a total of 1,937 persons.

The ship operated on the Havre—New York route, making one crossing in six days and four hours for an average of 21.63 knots.

Armed merchant cruiser Provence II
The ship was taken over by the French government to become the French Navy's Provence II, an armed merchant cruiser that was converted to a troopship in order to support the  Gallipoli Campaign and Macedonian campaign in World War I. Provence II was transporting troops from France to Salonika when she was sunk by the German U-boat  commanded by Lothar von Arnauld de la Perière south of Cape Matapan. The ship listed so quickly that many of the lifeboats could not be used. There were 742 survivors. Nearly 1,000 people were killed in the sinking.

Contemporary reports from Paris indicated nearly 4,000 persons aboard and 3,130 lives lost. Modern accounts of losses revise those numbers downward to about 1,700 troops aboard and under 1,000 lost.

The Sydney Morning Herald for 8 March 1916, and several other English-language papers, reported:
M. Bokanowski, a French Deputy, who is one of the survivors of the French auxiliary cruiser Provence, which was torpedoed and sunk in the Mediterranean, narrates that a battalion of the Third Colonial Infantry was aboard. There was no lamentation, and there was no panic, though the ship was sinking rapidly and the boilers exploding.
Captain Vesco, he states, remained on the bridge, calmly giving orders, and finally cried, "Adieu, mes enfants." The men clustered on the foredeck, and replied, "Vive la France." Then the Provence made a sudden plunge, and the foredeck rose perpendicularly above the water.
A British patrol and a French torpedo boat picked up the survivors after they had been 18 hours in the water. Many died or went mad before the rescue ships arrived.

See also
List by death toll of ships sunk by submarines
List of ocean liners

References

Bibliography

External links
 The Sinking of the Provence II, account by N. Bokanowski (link opens two pages before account)

1905 ships
Maritime incidents in 1916
Passenger ships of France
Ships built in France
Ships of the Compagnie Générale Transatlantique
Ships sunk by German submarines in World War I
World War I shipwrecks in the Mediterranean Sea